Space.com is an online publication focused on space exploration, astronomy, skywatching and entertainment, with editorial teams based in the United States and United Kingdom. The website offers live coverage of space missions, astronomical discoveries and reviews about skywatching telescopes, binoculars and sci-fi entertainment gear. It is owned by Future plc headquartered in Bath City, England. Its stories are often syndicated to other media outlets, including CNN, MSNBC, Yahoo!, and USA Today.

History 
Space.com was founded on July 20, 1999 on the 30th anniversary of the Apollo 11 moon landing by former CNN anchor Lou Dobbs and Rich Zahradnik in New York City. At that time, Dobbs owned a sizeable share of the company, and, in an unexpected move, left CNN later that year to become Space.com's chief executive officer.

The company struggled to turn a profit in its early days and when the dot-com bubble burst in 2000, many felt that it would collapse. Co-founder Rich Zahradnik left his position as president less than two months after the start of the company, former astronaut Sally Ride took his place but then stepped down in September 2000. Despite some growth, Space.com was not able to achieve what Dobbs had hoped for and in 2001, he returned to CNN.

As it expanded, it acquired other web sites such as Starport.com and Explorezone.com. It subsequently acquired Sienna Software (the company which produced the Starry Night software), and in 2018, SpaceNews acquired a partial equity stake in Space.com. 

In 2003, Space.com received the Online Journalism Award for Breaking News for its coverage of the Columbia shuttle disaster. In May 2004, Space.com's parent company changed its name from Space.com to Imaginova and in 2009 sold Space.com and other properties to Purch, an online publishing company.

In 2018, Space.com and other Purch consumer brands were sold to Future plc. Under Future, Space.com expanded its telescope, binoculars and astrophotography reviews and deals coverage, as well as tech and gaming product coverage for space and sci-fi fans, including streaming coverage for Star Trek, Star Wars and other science fiction programs on Netflix, Amazon, Hulu and other streaming services. 

Space.com also built up news coverage staff across the United States and United Kingdom, with writers in San Francisco, New York, London, Nottingham and Bath, U.K.

Editors 
Tariq Malik is the current Editor-in-Chief of Space.com, with Brett Tingley as Editor, and Mike Wall as Spaceflight/Tech Channel Editor. Photographer Jason Parnell-Brookes is the Cameras and Skywatching Channel Editor, and Ian Stokes is the Tech & Entertainment Channel Editor. Steve Spaleta is the current Senior Producer for video. Previous editors include: Anthony Duignan-Cabrera, Robert Roy Britt, Clara Moskowitz and Sarah Lewin.

See also 

List of astronomy websites

Notes

References
Space.com Is Back In Orbit - Forbes Magazine  18 January 2006 (accessed 5 June 2006)
Lou Dobbs Journeys From Wall Street To Space - Forbes Magazine 5 July 2000 (accessed 28 February 2006)
As dot.coms tumble, whither Dobbs' Space.com? Media Life Magazine 2 January 2001 (accessed 28 February 2006)
Imaginova.com About Us (accessed 28 February 2006)

External links
Space.com

American news websites
Astronomy websites
Space advocacy
Websites related to spaceflight